Sobów is a former village in Podkarpackie Voivodeship, Poland, and home to a rail station called Sobów, established in 1887. Now part of Tarnobrzeg. It is located in northern part of the town, bordering Wielowieś, Mokrzyszów, Sielec and Zakrzów. In Sobów Tomasz Dąbal and Franciszek Dąbal were born.

References 

Districts of Tarnobrzeg